The Commission to Explore a Route for a Canal to Lake Erie and Report, known as the Erie Canal Commission, was a body created by the New York State Legislature in 1810 to plan the Erie Canal. In 1817 a Canal Fund led by Commissioners of the Canal Fund was established to oversee the funding of construction of the canal. In 1826 a Canal Board, of which both the planning commissioners and the Canal Fund commissioners were members, was created to take control of the operational canal. The term "Canal Commission" was at times applied to any of these bodies. Afterwards the canal commissioners were minor state cabinet officers responsible for the maintenance and improvements of the state's canals.

The office of Canal Commissioner was abolished in 1876, and their responsibilities were taken over by the Superintendent of Public Works in February 1878. The Canal Fund and the Canal Board were abolished in 1910.

Origins of the Erie Canal Commission
As the United States expanded into western New York and the Northwest Territory, the Great Lakes became an essential part of the system of waterways, on which merchants did most of their shipping.  The easiest way from the Great Lakes to the Atlantic Ocean and Europe was by way of the St. Lawrence River, but this was controlled mainly by the French from Canada.  After examining the Mohawk River, a canal from the Great Lakes to the Hudson River was proposed. In addition to the control of shipping in North America, the United States would successfully tie the western territories to the eastern states, thus creating a more unified nation. This was an enormous undertaking, so it became necessary to appoint a Commission to oversee the entire project.

The origins of the Commission can be traced back to two men: Thomas Eddy and Jonas Platt. Eddy was the Treasurer of the Western Inland Lock Navigation Company, which had been established in 1792 with the purpose of developing a navigable route up the Mohawk River to Lake Ontario. When he found his company in financial trouble, he drew upon the idea first proposed by Joshua Forman (member of the New York State Assembly from Onondaga County in 1808) of building a canal, rather than trying to navigate the rivers. He turned to his friend Platt, then a State Senator and leader of the Federalists in New York, and the two of them decided to propose the creation of a small group of highly influential commissioners to explore two possible routes of a canal – one to Lake Ontario and one to Lake Erie. They would report findings to the New York State Legislature after their expedition to the west. In order to get permission for this commission, Platt and Eddy knew that each man had to command a certain amount of power and respect, but the whole group had to be politically balanced between Federalists and Democratic-Republicans. On March 13, 1810, Platt presented his project for a bipartisan Canal Commission to the State Legislature, and received overwhelming support. On March 15, the State Legislature appointed Federalists Gouverneur Morris, Stephen Van Rensselaer, William North and Thomas Eddy, and Democratic-Republicans DeWitt Clinton, Simeon DeWitt and Peter Buell Porter a commission to explore a route for a canal to Lake Erie, and report.

Surveying the route
In June 1810, the commissioners were prepared to head west to survey the land to determine a possible route for their canal. Though Gouverneur Morris was President of the Commission, the title was mainly ceremonial because all the members looked to DeWitt Clinton for leadership.  All of the members except Van Rensselaer and Morris, who traversed the whole state by carriage, traveled up the Mohawk River and as far west as possible by water, where they met two amateur surveyors, James Geddes and Benjamin Wright. From there, they traveled the final one hundred miles from Lake Seneca to Lake Erie by carriage. DeWitt Clinton kept a journal for the entire journey, in which he closely documented their adventures.

After much deliberation, the Commission turned their findings into a report that they submitted in March 1811.  Rejecting Porter’s ideas of running the canal either to Lake Ontario, or through his lands to Lake Erie, the commissioners decided that the canal had to run straight to Lake Erie.  Otherwise, the St. Lawrence River would still be a primary route of transportation and the West would not be connected to the East.  They also rejected Morris’s proposition of a natural waterway created by the overflow of Lake Erie in favor of an entirely artificial waterway. The final and most important section of the report demanded public financing and control of the canal by the State of New York. Citing past failures such as Eddy’s company, and George Washington’s Potomac Company, the Commission stated that such large endeavors were too expensive for private financing.

Response to the report
In response to this report, on April 8, 1811, the State Legislature passed the first of many laws relating to the canal. The bill added Robert Fulton and Robert R. Livingston to the Commission. Fulton had developed the first steamboat that ran along the Hudson River and Livingston was his business and engineering partner. It also gave the commissioners $15,000 to finance further activities and granted them permission to take all the necessary steps to finance the entire project. On June 19, 1812, the Commission was empowered to purchase the rights, interests and estate of the Western Inland Lock Navigation Company.

Eddy and Fulton looked for engineers to design the project. De Witt and Van Rensselaer sought land cessations for the path of the canal. Livingston, with the help of Clinton, devised a plan to secure national assistance. Morris and North looked for the best way to borrow money. The largest duty, however, was assigned to Clinton and Morris, who went to Washington, D.C., to solicit aid from President James Madison and the Federal Government. Unfortunately, after failing to obtain any funds from the government, their situation only got worse with the War of 1812.

War of 1812 and aftermath
With the outbreak of war, Van Rensselaer became the Head of the New York State Militia, and Clinton ran as the Federalists presidential candidate opposing James Madison and the war. In addition, despite allowing the Commission to create a fund for financing the canal in 1812, the State Legislature repealed the act in 1814, rendering the commissioners essentially helpless.

Finally, after the United States made peace with Great Britain, officials could turn their attention towards the canal, which they did in a public meeting in New York City on December 3, 1815.  The board sparked interest by emphasizing the benefits the city would receive from the canal. Despite minor setbacks, the meeting was a huge success. Even though President Madison vetoed a bill that provided funding for one quarter of the canal, the Commission convinced the State Legislature to go ahead with construction.

New appointments to the commission
On April 17, 1816, the State Legislature passed a bill that provided more funds for the project, and appointed Van Rensselaer, Clinton, Joseph Ellicott, Myron Holley and Samuel Young Commissioners to Construct a Canal from the Hudson River to Lake Erie and Lake Champlain. Ellicott was well informed about the lands in western New York as well as being an agent of the Holland Land Company, which donated 100,000 acres (400 km) to the Erie Canal project. Holley, a State assemblyman, was a supporter of Clinton and government-financed public improvements. Young had written A Treatise on Internal Navigation - A Comprehensive Study of Canals in Great Britain and Holland.

The project was soon caught up in politics, with either party attempting to receive the credit for the construction; the Bucktails struggled to gain control over the Commission, still firmly held by Clinton in 1817.

On April 19, 1817, the State Legislature created the Canal Fund to oversee construction. The Commissioners of the Canal Fund consisted ex officio of the Lieutenant Governor, the State Comptroller, the Attorney General, the Secretary of State, the State Treasurer and the Surveyor General. The existing Canal Commission was keep a separate planning body, thereby splitting Clinton's power over the canal.

In 1818, Ellicot resigned from the Commission citing poor health, and to replace him, Clinton appointed one of his strongest supporters Ephraim Hart. Recognizing Hart’s political allegiance, the Bucktail majority of the State Legislature elected a Clinton opponent, Henry Seymour, in 1819 to succeed Hart.

The Commission slipped even further out of Clinton’s control in 1821, when the Bucktail-controlled State Legislature passed a bill that provided two million dollars in funding for the canal, as well as the appointment of an additional commissioner. As Governor of New York, Clinton had to sign the bill so he was not seen as blocking the necessary funds. The Bucktails promptly elected William C. Bouck, another staunch Clinton opponent.

A heavy blow to Clinton came on April 12, 1824, when his opponents succeeded in ousting him from the Commission. Despite words of support in the State Assembly, they voted him out and Clinton stepped down after being a commissioner from the beginning and its president since 1816. A wave of indignation over the treatment of the man who was recognized as the driving force behind the construction, Clinton was re-elected Governor of New York in November 1824, and had the great satisfaction to preside over the inauguration of the completed Erie Canal on October 26, 1825.

Later reorganization and operations
The New York State Constitution of 1821 provided for the creation of the Canal Board to oversee the operational canal, which was established in 1826. The Board originally consisted of the same officers as the Commissioners of the Canal Fund, as well as the members of the Canal Commission, thereby merging he two in practical terms. In 1846, the newly created office of State Engineer and Surveyor replaced the Surveyor General.

Until 1844 the term of the commissioners was indefinite. The Act of May 6, 1844, established a four-year term, while vacancies were filled by concurrent resolution of both houses of the State Legislature, or during the recess of the Legislature, temporarily by the Governor, and a substitute was elected at the next State election if there was a remainder of the term. The Constitution of 1846 shortened the term to three years.

The office of Canal Commissioner was abolished by an amendment in 1876, with the functions of the office taken over by the new Commissioner of Public Works.

In 1903 New York State legislature authorized construction of the "New York State Barge Canal" as the "improvement  of the Erie, the Oswego, the Champlain and the Cayuga and Seneca Canals".
In 1905, construction of the Barge Canal began; it was completed in 1918, at a cost of $96.7 million. Now known as the New York State Canal System, it is operated by the New York State Canal Corporation.

List of Canal Commissioners

Notes

References
 Bernstein, Peter L, Wedding of the Waters, New York: W.W. Norton and Co., 2005.
 Cornog, Evan, The Birth of Empire: DeWitt Clinton and the American Experience, 1769-1828, New York: Oxford University Press, 1998.
 Koeppel, Gerard, "Bond of Union: Building the Erie Canal and the American Empire", Cambridge, Mass.: Da Capo Press, 2009.
 Shaw, Ronald E, Erie Water West: A History of the Erie Canal, 1792-1854 Lexington, Kentucky: The University Press of Kentucky, 1990.

Commission

1810 establishments in New York (state)